Henrik Ojamaa (born 20 May 1991) is an Estonian professional footballer who plays as a forward for FC Flora and the Estonia national team.

In 2012, Ojamaa was named the Estonian Young Footballer of the Year.

Club career

Flora
Ojamaa began playing football with the Flora youth academy. He made his senior league debut for the club's reserve side Flora II in the Esiliiga on 4 April 2007.

Derby County
In 2007, Ojamaa joined the Derby County academy. He was Derby County's Scholar of the Year in the 2008–09 season. In June 2009, he signed his first professional contract. On 28 November 2009, Ojamaa joined Stafford Rangers on a one-month loan. He won numerous Man of the Match awards during his short spell at the Conference North side. On 5 May 2010, it was announced that Ojamaa would be released after the 2009–10 season.

Alemannia Aachen
On 19 May 2010, Ojamaa signed a two-year contract with 2. Bundesliga club Alemannia Aachen. He made a single appearance in the 2. Bundesliga on 27 November 2010, replacing Babacar Gueye in the 88th minute of a 1–3 loss to FC Augsburg at New Tivoli.

Fortuna Sittard (loan)
In January 2011, Ojamaa joined Eerste Divisie club Fortuna Sittard on loan for the remainder of the 2010–11 season.

RoPS
On 22 July 2011, Ojamaa signed for the Veikkausliiga club RoPS for the remainder of the 2011 season. He went on to score two goals in 17 appearances, but couldn't save his club from relegation.

Motherwell
On 4 January 2012, Ojamaa signed for Scottish Premier League club Motherwell until the end of the 2011–12 season. He made an instant impact on his debut for Motherwell, scoring in a 4–0 home win over Queen's Park in the fourth round of the Scottish Cup on 7 January 2012. Ojamaa made his debut in the Scottish Premier League on 14 January 2012, when he came on as a 71st-minute substitute for Omar Daley in a 0–1 home loss to Inverness Caledonian Thistle. He scored four goals in his first five appearances for Motherwell and on 2 February 2012, he signed a new two-and-a-half year contract with the club. Ojamaa celebrated his contract extension with another goal and two assists in a 6–0 victory over Greenock Morton in a Scottish Cup match on 4 February 2012. Ojamaa became referred to as "The Sheriff" by fans during his stay at Motherwell due to his pistols goal celebration. His performances in January 2012 led to him being named Scottish Premier League Young Player of the Month, as well as the player of the fifth round of the Scottish Cup.

In addition to his four goals in the 2012–13 season, Ojamaa was also the league's top assist provider with 16.

Legia Warsaw
On 6 June 2013, Ojamaa signed a three-year contract with Polish champions Legia Warsaw for a fee of €500,000. He made his debut in the Ekstraklasa on 27 July 2013, coming on as a substitute and providing an assist for Vladimir Dvalishvili's goal in the 3–0 away victory over Pogoń Szczecin. Ojamaa scored his first Ekstraklasa goal on 3 August 2013, in a 4–0 home victory over Podbeskidzie Bielsko-Biała. He won the Ekstraklasa title in the 2013–14 season, his first league title.

Motherwell (loan)
On 14 August 2014, Ojamaa returned to Motherwell on a six-month loan deal. At the conclusion of the loan in January 2015, Ojamaa opted not to extend his stay at Motherwell and returned to Legia Warsaw.

Sarpsborg 08 (loan)
On 2 February 2015, Ojamaa joined Tippeligaen club Sarpsborg 08 on loan. He made his debut in the Tippeligaen on 6 April 2015, in a 1–0 away victory over Tromsø.

Swindon Town
On 4 September 2015, Ojamaa signed for League One side Swindon Town on a one-year deal. He made his debut for Swindon Town on 12 September 2015, in a 1–4 away loss to Barnsley.

Wacker Innsbruck
On 7 January 2016, Ojamaa signed for Erste Liga club Wacker Innsbruck.

Go Ahead Eagles
On 21 June 2016, Ojamaa signed a two-year contract with Eredivisie club Go Ahead Eagles. He made his debut in the Eredivisie on 6 August 2016, starting in a 0–3 away loss to ADO Den Haag. Ojamaa scored in his second match, a 2–2 home draw against NAC Breda on 14 August 2016.

Dundee (loan)
On 31 January 2017, Ojamaa joined Scottish Premiership club Dundee on loan until the end of the 2016–17 season.

Gorica
On 21 October 2017, Ojamaa signed for Druga HNL club Gorica until the end of the 2017–18 season. He scored 6 goals in 19 games as Gorica won the league and promotion to the Prva HNL.

Miedź Legnica
On 21 June 2018, Ojamaa signed for Ekstraklasa club Miedź Legnica on a two-year deal, with an option to extend the contract for another year.

International career
Ojamaa began his international career for Estonia with the under-17 national team. He was a part of the under-19 team that reached the 2009 UEFA European Under-19 Championship elite qualification round. Ojamaa also represented the under-21 team in the Under-21 Baltic Cup in 2008, and scored a hat-trick against Luxembourg in a 6–0 friendly win on 29 March 2011.

On 3 February 2012, Ojamaa received his first senior call-up by Tarmo Rüütli for a friendly against El Salvador. However the call-up was later dismissed by his club, Motherwell. He made his senior debut for Estonia on 25 May 2012, in a 1–3 loss to Croatia in a friendly. Ojamaa scored his first international goal on 30 May 2018, in a 2–0 win over Lithuania at the 2018 Baltic Cup.

Personal life
Ojamaa has two brothers: Hindrek, the younger brother, is also a professional footballer, while Harri, the older brother, was forced to end his football career at the age of 19 due to an injury. Harri now works as an agent for Golden Star Management who also represent Henrik.

Career statistics

Club

International

International goals
As of 30 May 2018. Estonia score listed first, score column indicates score after each Ojamaa goal.

Honours

Club
Legia Warsaw
Ekstraklasa: 2013–14

Gorica
Druga HNL: 2017–18

Flora
Estonian Supercup: 2021

Individual
Estonian Young Footballer of the Year: 2012

References

External links

1991 births
Living people
Footballers from Tallinn
Estonian footballers
Association football forwards
Esiliiga players
FC Flora players
English Football League players
Derby County F.C. players
Swindon Town F.C. players
National League (English football) players
Stafford Rangers F.C. players
2. Bundesliga players
Alemannia Aachen players
Eerste Divisie players
Fortuna Sittard players
Veikkausliiga players
Rovaniemen Palloseura players
Scottish Premier League players
Scottish Professional Football League players
Motherwell F.C. players
Dundee F.C. players
Ekstraklasa players
Legia Warsaw players
Miedź Legnica players
Eliteserien players
Norwegian Third Division players
Sarpsborg 08 FF players
2. Liga (Austria) players
FC Wacker Innsbruck (2002) players
Eredivisie players
Go Ahead Eagles players
First Football League (Croatia) players
HNK Gorica players
Estonia youth international footballers
Estonia under-21 international footballers
Estonia international footballers
Estonian expatriate footballers
Estonian expatriate sportspeople in England
Expatriate footballers in England
Estonian expatriate sportspeople in Germany
Expatriate footballers in Germany
Estonian expatriate sportspeople in the Netherlands
Expatriate footballers in the Netherlands
Estonian expatriate sportspeople in Finland
Expatriate footballers in Finland
Estonian expatriate sportspeople in Scotland
Expatriate footballers in Scotland
Estonian expatriate sportspeople in Poland
Expatriate footballers in Poland
Estonian expatriate sportspeople in Norway
Expatriate footballers in Norway
Estonian expatriate sportspeople in Austria
Expatriate footballers in Austria
Expatriate footballers in Croatia
Estonian expatriate sportspeople in Croatia